The 2015 Axalta "We Paint Winners" 400 was a NASCAR Sprint Cup Series race held on June 7, 2015, at Pocono Raceway in Long Pond, Pennsylvania. Contested over 160 laps on the 2.5 mile (4 km) triangular superspeedway, it was the 14th race of the 2015 NASCAR Sprint Cup Series season. Martin Truex Jr. won the race, while Kevin Harvick finished second, Jimmie Johnson finished third, Joey Logano and Kurt Busch rounded out the top five.

Kurt Busch won the pole for the race. He failed to lead a lap. Truex led the most laps for the fourth consecutive race in leading 97 laps. He took the lead with 36 laps to go and scored the victory. The race had twelve lead changes among six different drivers, as well as eight caution flag periods for 31 laps.

This was the third career win for Martin Truex Jr. and first since the 2013 Toyota/Save Mart 350 at Sonoma Raceway. It was the second win for Furniture Row Racing and first since the 2011 Showtime Southern 500 at Darlington Raceway. Despite the win, he left Pocono trailing Kevin Harvick by 39 points in the drivers standings. Chevrolet left with a 59-point lead over Ford in the manufacturer standings.

The Axalta "We Paint Winners" 400 was carried by Fox Sports on the cable/satellite Fox Sports 1 network for the American television audience. The radio broadcast for the race was carried by the Motor Racing Network and Sirius XM NASCAR Radio.

Report

Background

Pocono Raceway (formerly Pocono International Raceway) also known as the Tricky Triangle, is a superspeedway located in the Pocono Mountains of Pennsylvania at Long Pond. It is the site of two annual NASCAR Sprint Cup Series races held just weeks apart in June and August, and one NASCAR Camping World Truck Series event in August.  Since 2013, the track is also host to a Verizon IndyCar Series race.

Pocono is one of a very few NASCAR tracks not owned by either Speedway Motorsports, Inc. or International Speedway Corporation, the dominant track owners in NASCAR. It is run by the Igdalsky siblings Brandon, Nicholas, and sister Ashley, and cousins Joseph IV and Chase Mattioli, all of whom are third-generation members of the family-owned Mattco Inc, started by Joseph II and Rose Mattioli.  Mattco also owns South Boston Speedway in South Boston, Virginia.

Outside of the NASCAR races, Pocono is used throughout the year by Sports Car Club of America (SCCA) and motorcycle clubs as well as racing schools. The triangular oval also has three separate infield sections of racetrack – North Course, East Course and South Course. Each of these infield sections use a separate portion of the tri-oval to complete the track.  During regular non-race weekends, multiple clubs can use the track by running on different infield sections.  Also some of the infield sections can be run in either direction, or multiple infield sections can be put together – such as running the North Course and the South Course and using the tri-oval to connect the two.

Kevin Harvick entered Pocono with a 44-point lead over Martin Truex Jr. following a runner-up finish at Dover. Jimmie Johnson and Joey Logano entered 76 back. Dale Earnhardt Jr. entered 84 back.

Pit crew apparel
Beginning this weekend, all pit crew members were required to wear specially made gloves, head socks and underwear that are certified by the SFI Foundation. Previously, only the gas can man was required to wear all these items.

Entry list
The entry list for the Axalta "We Paint Winners" 400 was released on Monday, June 1 at 4:45 p.m. Eastern time. Forty-three cars were entered for the race. This was the first race this season in which nobody failed to qualify for the race. The two driver changes from the previous race to this race were the No. 32 Go FAS Racing Ford that was driven by Travis Kvapil and the No. 33 Hillman-Circle Sport LLC Chevrolet that was driven by Ty Dillon.

First practice
Eighty-five minutes into the session, Tony Stewart got loose exiting turn 2, slid down and crashed into the tire barrier on the inside wall. Stewart told Fox Sports 1, “I was already past the bump (from the tunnel turn), got loose on the exit of it and I couldn’t catch it. So, driver error.” The damage sustained forced the team to roll out their backup car. Because this change took place prior to qualifying, he won't be required to start the race from the rear of the field.

Qualifying

The car was just off-balance, especially with the new bumps in Turn 2. And then we got way loose. I think we were 30th in practice. And we had to drop back and punt. (Danica Patrick’s crew chief) Daniel Knost, his set-up, is what we reverted to from last year when we qualified outside pole. So, that’s what it’s all about, team communication and working hard together as a group.” “Yeah, I was just disappointed that we didn’t have great speed,” Brad Keselowski said after qualifying seventh. “I’m not really sure why, but that’s just part of it.” Only seven drivers posted a time in the final round after Denny Hamlin spun out in turn 1. The session was stopped with 39 seconds remaining. Because no one would be able to make it around in the remaining time to start a qualifying lap, the session was concluded. “The circumstances though, I’d like to see everybody finish their lap,” Busch said. “I always thought they should freeze the time when somebody spins. That way everybody still gets to get back out there and make their lap."

Questions were raised over Denny Hamlin getting placed ahead of the other four drivers that didn't post a time in the third round since his spin caused the session to end prematurely. In his weekly appearance on the Sirius XM NASCAR Radio program The Morning Drive the Tuesday after the race, NASCAR Executive Vice-President and Chief Operating Officer Steve O'Donnell discussed with Mike Bagley and Pete Pistone about changing that particular policy.

Qualifying results

Practice (post-qualifying)

Second practice

Final practice

Race

First half

Start
The race was scheduled to start at 1:20 p.m., but started one minute later when Kurt Busch led the field to the green flag. He didn't lead the first lap, however, as Carl Edwards passed him in turn 1. Jeff Gordon puled to within a car length of him, but began pulling away from the field after a few laps. By lap 14, Martin Truex Jr. and Kevin Harvick reeled in Edwards. After a few attempts at him, Truex made the pass on Edwards and took the lead on lap 16. Brad Keselowski, running seventh, made an unscheduled stop on lap 21. He rejoined the race 37th. This triggered a wave of cars making this first pit stops of the race. Matt Kenseth, Joey Logano and Paul Menard were tagged for speeding on pit road. Kenseth and Logano were forced to serve a drive-through penalty. Menard was forced to serve a stop-go penalty for speeding in all sections after his pit box. He had to come a second time for speeding again. He cut down his left-front tire and came down pit road for a third time. Truex, Jr. made his first pit stop on lap 29 and handed the lead to Edwards. Edwards pitted on lap 30 and handed the lead to Kasey Kahne, who made his stop on lap 32. Then the lead was given back to Kevin Harvick.

Second quarter
Debris on the front stretch brought out the first caution on lap 49. The debris was a piece of the splitter from Menard's car. Truex exited pit road with the lead by taking just two tires.

The race restarted on lap 55. Truex's lead over Harvick began to shrink by lap 65. The second caution flew on lap 69 when Ricky Stenhouse Jr., going into the tunnel turn, dove into the corner to try passing Casey Mears, got loose, overcorrected, and slammed the wall. "The brakes were getting hot and we were having to pump them up," Stenhouse said. "They kind of maintained the first run and everything felt OK. I was still having to pump it up and on that last run I was having to pump them up three or four times, and then when the 13 (Mears) got into us down the back straightaway I was too busy catching it and too busy being sideways, and then once I finally caught it I didn't have time to pump up the brakes and the brakes went to the floor. Then I was just trying to make it through the corner without hitting anybody else and tried to keep it out of the wall, but didn't quite do it." Harvick chose not to pit, so he had the lead under the caution.

Second half

Halfway
The race restarted on lap 74. The third caution of the race flew on lap 88 when Jimmie Johnson cut down his left-front tire in turn 2. He was able to get his car down to the bottom of the track. Austin Dillon chose not to pit under the caution, so he assumed the lead.

The race restarted with on lap 93. Gordon passed Dillon going into turn 1 and took the lead. The fourth caution flew the same lap when Alex Bowman, going into turn 3, got turned by Brett Moffitt and spun. Gordon pitted and handed the lead to Martin Truex Jr.

The race restarted on lap 97. The fifth caution of the race flew with 39 laps to go for a single car wreck in turn 1. Going into 1, Sam Hornish Jr. cut a tire and slammed the wall hard.

Fourth quarter

The race restarted with 35 laps to go. The sixth caution of the race flew with 32 laps to go for a single car wreck in turn 1. As Moffitt was riding the high line in 1, Brad Keselowski hit him in the left rear corner and sent the No. 34 car spinning. Tony Stewart was tagged for an uncontrolled tire and was forced to restart the race from the rear of the field.

The race restarted with 27 laps to go. The seventh caution of the race flew for a single car wreck in turn 1. After making hard contact with the wall exiting turn 4, Danica Patrick cut down the right-rear tire and backed into the turn 1 wall. "I was trying the best I could to get back into the top-10, and the car just hopped the wall," Patrick said. "We were having a great race, and I hate that wrecked our day.”

The race restarted with 21 laps to go. The eighth caution of the race flew with 20 laps to go for a single car wreck in turn 1. Going through the corner, A. J. Allmendinger got loose, drifted up the track, tapped Ryan Newman and sent him right into the wall.

The race restarted with 16 laps to go. Patrick spun out exiting turn 3, but because she spun into pit road, the race remained green. Truex Jr. pulled away from the field to snap a 69 race winless streak.

Post-race

Post-race comments
“It feels unbelievable,” Truex said. “I knew we were going to get one. Everyone kept asking when are you going to get one. I knew we were going to win. I knew we had the team and what it took. I feel that I’m on Cloud Nine right now. The last year and a half have been pretty tough, but this feels real good. It never gets any better than this. It takes time to heal things especially with what Sherry and I went through. This just kind of makes you forget all about it. Tomorrow we are still going back to normal life and we always try to remember that and be ourselves and remember why we are here. And how thankful we are to be here and how lucky we are to be doing this. I just feel super blessed to be with this group of guys.”

“I think everybody is probably frustrated that we didn't win, but I think it's frustrated in a good way,” Harvick said of his latest second-place finish on Sunday. “It's very rare that you can come to the racetrack and be in those positions every week. I think when you look at the just like today, we were literally coming to pit road when the caution flag flew and never really made up those ten spots that we lost, and struggled on the restarts to get going. I think as you look at the situations, I think second is better than tenth.”

Jimmie Johnson rallied from a cut tire and brushing the wall to finish third. “Today we really didn't have pace for the 78 (Truex Jr.) or the 4 (Harvick), so we've got to get to work there,” Johnson said. “With the damaged car we ran third, missing half the splitter and the right side knocked in, some hard racing on one of those restarts off Turn 3. To get a good result, we overcame a lot today, having to deal with a flat tire, the damage to the car, and then I got to third. We'll take it. Scrappy day for us, but not the end of the world, either.”

Jimmie Johnson had some words of congrats for the race winner. "He's had more to overcome personally and professionally than probably anybody sitting in that seat right now," Johnson said. "For him to still walk in the garage every week with a smile on his face, climb in the car, be the great guy he is, I think speak volumes. It's a very popular win."

Race results

Race statistics
12 lead changes among 6 different drivers
8 cautions for 31 laps
Time of race: 2 hours, 58 minutes, 45 seconds
Average speed: 
Martin Truex Jr. took home $201,810 in winnings

Race awards
 Coors Light Pole Award: Kurt Busch (50.676)
 3M Lap Leader: Martin Truex Jr. (97 laps)
 American Ethanol Green Flag Restart Award: Martin Truex Jr.
 Duralast Brakes "Bake In The Race" Award: Kevin Harvick
 Freescale "Wide Open": Kevin Harvick
 Ingersoll Rand Power Move: Jeff Gordon (6 positions)
 MAHLE Clevite Engine Builder of the Race: Hendrick Engines, #4
 Mobil 1 Driver of the Race: Martin Truex Jr. (147.0 driver rating)
 Moog Steering and Suspension Problem Solver of The Race: Joey Logano (crew chief Todd Gordon (0.412))
 NASCAR Sprint Cup Leader Bonus: No winner: rolls over to $110,000 at next event
 Sherwin-Williams Fastest Lap: Kyle Busch (Lap 101, 51.852)
 Sunoco Rookie of The Race: Brett Moffitt

Media

Television
Fox Sports covered their seventh race at Pocono Raceway and first since 2006. Mike Joy, Larry McReynolds and four-time Pocono winner Darrell Waltrip had the call in the booth for the race. Jamie Little, Chris Neville and Matt Yocum handled the pit road duties for the television side.

Radio
MRN had the radio call for the race, which was simulcast on Sirius XM NASCAR Radio. Joe Moore and Jeff Striegle called the race in the booth when the field was racing down the front stretch. Dave Moody called the race from atop a billboard outside of turn 1 when the field was racing through turn 1. Mike Bagley called the race from a billboard outside turn 2 when the field was racing through turn 2. Kyle Rickey called the race from a billboard outside turn 3 when the field was racing through turn 3. Alex Hayden, Winston Kelley and Steve Post worked pit road for MRN.

Standings after the race

Drivers' Championship standings

Manufacturers' Championship standings

Note: Only the first sixteen positions are included for the driver standings.

Note

References

Axalta "We Paint Winners" 400
Axalta "We Paint Winners" 400
NASCAR races at Pocono Raceway